A lactation consultant is a health professional who specializes in the clinical management of breastfeeding. The International Board of Lactation Consultant Examiners (IBLCE) certifies lactation consultants who meet its criteria and have passed its exam.

Description
Lactation consultants are trained to assist mothers in preventing and solving breastfeeding difficulties such as sore nipples and low milk supply. They commonly work in hospitals, physician or midwife practices, public health programs, and private practice. In the United States, lactation consultants are often nurses, midwives, nurse practitioners, and dieticians who have obtained additional certification.

History and organization
The IBLCE was founded by a group of La Leche League leaders who wanted to professionalize the skills they had developed while working with breastfeeding mothers. Candidates can choose various pathways to qualify, including options for current health professionals and volunteers, through college or university academic programs, or through mentoring.  

An International Board Certified Lactation Consultant (IBCLC) may use the post nominals IBCLC and/or RLC after their name. The International Lactation Consultant Association (ILCA) is the professional association for lactation consultants.

IBCLCs undergo specialized training to assist families with breastfeeding, milk production issues, and pump management issues.  IBCLCs must meet certification requirements for education and clinical experience, and pass an examination. IBCLCs must also re-certify every five years with 75 continuing education hours every five years or take an examination.

Outcomes
Exclusive and partial breastfeeding are more common among mothers who gave birth in IBCLC-equipped hospitals. In maternity hospitals, a ratio of one IBCLC for every 15 postpartum mothers is suggested. The U.S. Surgeon General recommends that all communities ensure access to services provided by IBCLCs. Evidence found that breastfeeding interventions including lactation consultants and counselors increased the number of women initiating breastfeeding.

See also
Lactation counselor
Postpartum confinement, the period after childbirth when the new mother rests and bonds with her newborn, as they both learn to breastfeed
Wet nurse, a woman paid to nurse another's baby
Newborn care specialists, a type of nanny

References

Cited works

External links

International Lactation Consultant Association
International Board of Lactation Consultant Examiners

Breastfeeding
Consulting occupations
Health care occupations
Gendered occupations